Kleine Brogel Air Base  is a Belgian Air Component military airfield located  east of Kleine-Brogel, in the municipality Peer, Belgium. It is home to the Belgian 10th Tactical Wing, operating F-16 Fighting Falcons, which are capable, among other capabilities, of delivering B61 nuclear bombs.

History
The base has been subject to much political controversy, because of US nuclear weapons being stored in the facility by the United States Air Force (USAF), but never recognized officially by the Belgian government. Under the NATO nuclear sharing arrangement, these nuclear bombs would require an actual dual key system, which would imply the simultaneous authorizations of Belgium and the United States, before any action is taken. Should that be the case, Kleine Brogel Air Base would be the only location in Belgium with nuclear weapons. According to the press, Eastern European Member States of NATO resisted the withdrawal of the "shared" nuclear bombs in Europe, fearing that it would show a weakening of the US commitment to defend the European Union against Russian aggression.

None of the five NATO member states, whose air forces store nuclear bombs in its premises (Belgium, Germany, Italy, the Netherlands and Turkey), have ever provided an official confirmation of its existence. However, former Italian President Francesco Cossiga declared that the Aeronautica Militare hosted or shared US nuclear bombs, just as other NATO member states do. In an interview he talked about French weapons. In the same way, on 10 June 2013, former Dutch prime minister Ruud Lubbers confirmed the existence of 22 shared nuclear bombs at Volkel Air Base.

Kleine Brogel Air Base is also the home of the United States Air Force's 701st Munitions Support Squadron which allegedly is the unit in charge of looking after the nuclear bombs.

AFN Benelux broadcast from Kleine Brogel Air Base in the 106.2 MHz in FM.

Based units 
Units based at Kleine Brogel.

Belgian Air Component 
10th Tactical Wing

 Flying Group
 31st Squadron – F-16AM Falcon
 349th Squadron – F-16AM Falcon
 Operational Conversion Unit – F-16BM Falcon
 Current Operations Squadron
 Maintenance Group
 Defense and Support Group

United States Air Force 
US Air Forces in Europe - Air Forces Africa (USAFE-AFAFRICA)

 Third Air Force
 52nd Fighter Wing
 52nd Munitions Maintenance Group
 701st Munition Support Squadron

See also 
 Transportation in Belgium

References

External links 

 

Belgian airbases
Airports in Limburg (Belgium)
Military airbases established in 1945